The Grumman Gulfstream I (company designation G-159) is a twin-turboprop business aircraft. It first flew on August 14, 1958.

Design and development
After first rejecting an idea to develop the Grumman Widgeon as an executive transport, the company studied producing an executive transport based on a turbine-powered variant of the naval utility transport Grumman TF-1 Trader. The company had already determined that any new aircraft would have to be turboprop-powered and the Rolls-Royce Dart engine was chosen. Further studies showed that the Trader-based design would not sell and they needed an all-new design with a low-wing and room to stand up in the cabin.  In June 1957 the design of G-159 was finalised and Grumman started selling slots on the production line at $10,000 each. The initial customers worked with Grumman on the detailed design and avionics fit. The G-159 was given the name Gulfstream and on 14 August 1958 the first aircraft, registered N701G, took off from Bethpage, New York on its maiden flight. By 2 May 1959 the aircraft was awarded a type certificate by the Federal Aviation Administration (FAA).

The Gulfstream I is a low-wing cantilever monoplane with a semi-monocoque aluminium alloy fuselage structure. The aircraft is powered by two Rolls-Royce Dart turboprops with Rotol four-bladed constant speed propellers. The Gulfstream I has a retractable tricycle landing gear, with twin wheels on the two main units and the nose gear.  The cabin is designed to take up to twenty-four passengers in a high-density arrangement or only eight in an executive layout, although ten to twelve was more usual. The aircraft has a hydraulically operated airstair in the forward cabin for entry and exit.

The United States military version for this plane is the C-4 Academe. The TC-4 is a version with added instruments and navigation. It was used by the US Navy for bombardier/navigator training for the A-6 Intruder. A VC-4A variant was flown by the United States Coast Guard as an executive transport until the early 1980s. It was later used as a logistics and long-range command and control aircraft until 2001.

A 37-passenger stretched version, the G-159C, was developed by Gulfstream for regional airline use. Five were delivered from November 1980. Air North (based in Plattsburgh NY and which subsequently changed  its name to Brockway Air) was one of the few airlines in the U.S. to use this version before its acquisition by Brockway Glass.  Another Gulfstream I-C airline operator was Chaparral Airlines which flew passenger services  as American Eagle via a codesharing agreement with American Airlines. Royale Airlines also operated the G-I in scheduled passenger service in the U.S. operating as Continental Connection on behalf of Continental Airlines; however, its aircraft were standard length G-159 models and thus were not the stretched version.  Several other airlines in the U.S. as well air carriers in Africa, Canada, Europe and the Mideast also operated standard Gulfstream Is in scheduled passenger service, including Peregrine Air Services in the U.K. which operated airline flights for British Airways.

Operational history

As of August 2006, a total of 44 Grumman Gulfstream I aircraft remained in service. The major operator is Phoenix Air in the United States with 13 aircraft. Some 19 other airlines also operate the type. A G-I purchased by Walt Disney in 1964 and last flown on Oct. 8, 1992 was on display at Disney's Hollywood Studios and is set to be moved to Palm Springs Air Museum. The aircraft logged 8800 flights and 20,000 flight hours with notable passengers Richard Nixon, Ronald Reagan, Jimmy Carter, Julie Andrews, Hugh O'Brian, and Annette Funicello. The Broadcasting Board of Governors operated a Gulfstream I as an airborne broadcasting studio for Radio y Televisión Martí in international airspace near Cuba from 2006 to 2013.

Variants

G-159 Gulfstream I
Twin-engined executive, corporate transport aircraft with accommodation for up to 14 passengers, powered by two 2,210-ehp (1648-kW) Rolls-Royce Dart RDa.7/2 Mk 529-8X turboprop engines. 200 built.
G-159C Gulfstream I-C
Stretched regional airline version.
VC-4A
VIP transport version for the US Coast Guard. One built.
TC-4B
United States military designation for a cancelled order for ten aircraft for the United States Navy for the navigation training and transport duties.
TC-4C Academe
United States military designation for a bombardier, navigator trainer for the US Navy and Marine Corps, first flown in 1967. Aircraft were fitted with a Grumman A-6 Intruder nose radome, a simulated A-6 cockpit and four bombadier/navigator consoles for A-6 crew training, nine built.  The aircraft used by VA-42 was last seen in 2018 at the Davis-Monthan Air Force Base, 309th Aerospace Maintenance and Regeneration Group (AMARG).  The "Green Pawn" emblem is still visible on the tail.

Operators
Most of the 200 Gulfstream I propjets were operated by corporate customers, with a smaller number operated by regional or commuter airlines as well as by government agencies and the military. NASA, the U.S. space agency, flew the Gulfstream I as a passenger transport aircraft and operated seven G-Is.  Throughout the 1970s and mid-80s the Ford Motor Company operated a G-1 for their executives in Brazil.  The Walt Disney Company operated Gulfstream S.N. 121 with the factory assigned tail number N732G from December of 1963 to October 4, 1967, when it was changed to N234MM.

Civilian operators

 Ptarmigan Airways - Former scheduled passenger airline operator.
 Wardair

 Cimber Air - Former scheduled passenger airline operator.
 Democratic Republic of Congo
 Malu Aviation

 Air Provence - Former scheduled passenger airline operator.

 Gabon Express - Former scheduled passenger airline operator.

 Aeroel Airways - Former scheduled passenger airline operator.

 East African Safari Air - Former scheduled passenger airline operator.
 Kenya Flamingo Airways - Former scheduled passenger airline operator.

 Seven Air - Former scheduled passenger airline operator.

 Swedish Civil Aviation Administration (CAA) - Flight inspection (Radio Navigational Aids).

 Aberdeen Airways - Former scheduled passenger airline operator.
 Birmingham European Airways - Former scheduled passenger airline operator.
 Birmingham Executive Airways - Former scheduled passenger airline operator.
 British Airways -  Former scheduled passenger airline feeder service operated via contract by Peregrine Air Services.
 Capital Airlines - Former scheduled passenger airline operator.

 Air North - Former scheduled passenger airline operator of the stretched, 37-passenger Gulfstream I-C.  Air North, which operated in the northeast U.S.,  subsequently changed its name to Brockway Air.
 Air US - Former scheduled passenger airline operator flying several commuter routes from Denver Stapleton International Airport (DEN).  Fleet included stretched, 37-passenger Gulfstream I-C aircraft.
 Bonanza Air Lines - Former scheduled passenger airline operator.
 Chaparral Airlines - Former scheduled passenger airline operator of the stretched, 37-passenger Gulfstream I-C. Chaparral operated as American Eagle providing passenger feed for the American Airlines hub located at the Dallas/Fort Worth International Airport (DFW).
 Coleman Air Transport - Former scheduled passenger airline operator which operated a small hub at the Chicago Rockford International Airport (RFD) in Illinois.
 NASA - Former operator with seven G-I aircraft being used to transport NASA and space program contractor personnel between the civilian space agency's various centers and facilities in the U.S.
 Phoenix Air
 Royale Airlines - Former scheduled passenger airline operator with some flights operated via a code-sharing agreement with Continental Airlines providing passenger feed for the Continental hub located at Houston Intercontinental Airport (IAH).
 Scenic Air - Former scheduled passenger airline operator with service from Oakland International Airport (OAK).
 Southeast Airlines - Former scheduled passenger airline operator.
 Susquehanna Airlines - Former scheduled passenger airline operator.

Military operators

 Hellenic Air Force - One aircraft delivered in July 1964, now preserved at Dekelia Air Base. 

 United States Army - The United States Army Corps of Engineers operated a single Gulfstream I (with a civilian colour scheme and registration) between 1961 and 1981. The US Army also later received at least one  Gulfstream I that had been confiscated from drug dealers.
 United States Coast Guard
 United States Marine Corps
 United States Navy

Specifications

See also

References
Notes

Bibliography

External links

 The Grumman G-159 Gulfstream I on Airliners.net
 "Dart-Powered Executive" a 1959 Flight article on the Gulfstream
 "Online Gulfstream 1 Museum" Information on every G159 manufacturered

1950s United States business aircraft
Gulfstream I
Gulfstream I
Low-wing aircraft
Aircraft first flown in 1958
Twin-turboprop tractor aircraft